Hautcharage is a small town in the commune of Käerjeng, in south-western Luxembourg.

Geography
Neighbouring towns include Clemency, Fingig, Hivange, Schouweiler, Bascharage and Linger.

The small river Mierbaach, which rises at the Boufferdenger Muer, flows through Hautcharage.

History 
The church in Hautcharage was built in the 18th century in Baroque style.

Sport 
Hautcharage used to be home to a football club, Jeunesse Hautcharage, which won the Luxembourg Cup in 1971.  As a result, Hautcharage qualified for the UEFA Cup Winners' Cup; in the first round, Hautcharage drew Chelsea, and lost 21-0 on aggregate, which remains a European record defeat.  In 1997, the club merged with neighbours Union Sportive Bascharage, forming UN Käerjeng 97, which is based in Bascharage.

Notable residents 
 Michel Wolter, former mayor and Minister of the Interior
 Henri Kellen, Olympic cyclist (1948)

References

External links
 Official website , Gemeng Käerjeng 

Bascharage
Towns in Luxembourg